Ommo Clark is a Nigerian software designer, techpreneur, public speaker,  CEO and founding director of iBez Nigeria. iBez Nigeria is an indigenous technology company that caters for the needs of businesses in emerging and underserved markets by developing software applications and online platforms and also trains software developers on software development processes. IBez is the producer of Handy-jack, the platform that connects artisans and professional service provider with their seekers.

Education 
Clark is an alumnus of London Guildhall University UK with Bachelors (Hons) in Business Administration. She also holds an MSc in Information Systems from Brunel University UK.

Career 
Clark had a brief career in International Development after which she worked as an application support consultant with Real Asset Management UK. Several years later, she joined the investment bank, Lehman Brothers UK and worked as a team leader in the Mortgage capital division. Four years later, she joined Icelandic Investment Bank UK after leaving Lehman Brothers where she worked as an IT project manager. In 2008, she returned to Nigeria and worked with a software solutions company as head of project delivery and support. She joined International Development Company as Chief Operating Officer (COO) in 2012.

In 2013, Clark decided to start iBez Nigeria, her own indigenous technology company, to promote and showcase locally developed software applications. Products created by iBez include: 
 Handy-Jacks, an online directory of maintenance and repair artisans for referencing by homeowners and businesses
 Schools Network Integrated Programme (SNIP)
 Project management information system (PMIS)
 Hotel Motel Solution
 Let's Share
 Exchange BBP  
Clark started her ICT business initiatives from her laptop.

References

External links

Tech Trends: The Internet And How It Affects You Pt.2 20/01/15

Year of birth missing (living people)
Living people
Nigerian technology businesspeople
Nigerian expatriates in the United Kingdom
Businesspeople from Lagos
21st-century Nigerian businesswomen
21st-century Nigerian businesspeople
Nigerian women company founders
Nigerian social entrepreneurs
Alumni of London Guildhall University
Alumni of Brunel University London